Nathan Anthony James Taylor (born 2 April 1990) is an English footballer.

Career
Taylor was signed by Hamilton Academical from Rochdale in 2006. He made his debut for Hamilton in January 2007 against Livingston in the Scottish Cup. However, he was released in July of that year.
  
After Hamilton, Taylor signed for Scottish Premier League club Gretna. He made his debut for the side against Aberdeen in March 2008, after many of the club's senior players resigned following the club entering administration. On 19 May 2008 Taylor was part of the remaining 40 staff members who were released by Gretna.

After a spell at Clitheroe, Taylor joined FC Halifax Town ahead of the 2010–11 season. He scored four goals for the team in a pre-season match against Brighouse Town and continued his good form scoring twice in the FA Cup in September 2010 as Town beat Ashton United.

Taylor moved to Northwich Victoria FC in January 2011, making his debut on 18 January in a 2–1 win over Warrington Town FC. He was substituted after claiming his first assist.

In February 2011, he moved clubs again this time joining Bradford Park Avenue.

References

External links

FC Halifax Town profile

1990 births
Living people
English footballers
Association football forwards
Hamilton Academical F.C. players
Gretna F.C. players
Scottish Premier League players
Clitheroe F.C. players
Rochdale Town F.C. players
FC Halifax Town players
Rhyl F.C. players
Bradford (Park Avenue) A.F.C. players
Northwich Victoria F.C. players
Mossley A.F.C. players
Salford City F.C. players
Celtic F.C. players